Walter Colville Steele (8 September 1878 – 12 September 1941) was an Australian rules footballer who played with Melbourne in the Victorian Football League (VFL).

Notes

External links 

Wally Steele on Demonwiki

1878 births
1941 deaths
Australian rules footballers from Victoria (Australia)
Melbourne Football Club players
People educated at Scotch College, Melbourne
Melbourne Football Club (VFA) players